Alina Fyodorova (born 31 July 1989) is a Ukrainian athlete competing in heptathlon and women's pentathlon. She has achieved her personal best of 6126 points.

Fyodorova got 21st place at the 2011 World Championships in Daegu, reaching 5908 points.

Competition record

References

External links

1989 births
Living people
Ukrainian heptathletes
World Athletics Championships athletes for Ukraine
Athletes (track and field) at the 2016 Summer Olympics
Olympic athletes of Ukraine
Sportspeople from Kyiv Oblast
21st-century Ukrainian women